The Atane Formation is a geologic formation in Greenland. It preserves fossil insects of Elytrulum multipunctatum, dating back to the Albian to Coniacian stages of the Cretaceous period.

Description 
The carbonaceous mudstones, sandstones and coal seams are interpreted as freshwater lake or swamp deposits representing the vertical aggradation of a subaerial to shallow, limnic floodplain to upper delta plain. There are no indications –neither palynological evidence nor the presence of pyrite– to suggest marine or brackish-water conditions.

See also 
 List of fossiliferous stratigraphic units in Greenland

References

Bibliography 
 

Geologic formations of Greenland
Cretaceous System of North America
Cretaceous Greenland
Albian Stage
Cenomanian Stage
Coniacian Stage
Turonian Stage
Mudstone formations
Sandstone formations
Coal formations
Fluvial deposits
Lacustrine deposits
Paludal deposits
Paleontology in Greenland